Rumyana Glacier is the  long and  wide glacier on the east side of north-central Sentinel Range in Ellsworth Mountains, Antarctica, situated northwest of Patton Glacier and southeast of Delyo Glacier.  It drains the east slopes of Mount Giovinetto and the north slopes of Evans Peak, and flows northeastwards to join Ellen Glacier northwest of Mount Jumper.

The glacier is named after the Bulgarian woman rebel leader Rumyana Voyvoda (19th century).

Location
US mapping in 1961, updated in 1988.

See also
 List of glaciers in the Antarctic
 Glaciology

Maps
 Vinson Massif.  Scale 1:250 000 topographic map.  Reston, Virginia: US Geological Survey, 1988.
 Antarctic Digital Database (ADD). Scale 1:250000 topographic map of Antarctica. Scientific Committee on Antarctic Research (SCAR). Since 1993, regularly updated.

References
 Bulgarian Antarctic Gazetteer. Antarctic Place-names Commission. (details in Bulgarian, basic data in English)
 Rumyana Glacier SCAR Composite Gazetteer of Antarctica

External links
 Rumyana Glacier. Copernix satellite image

Glaciers of Ellsworth Land
Bulgaria and the Antarctic